The Santa Margarita was a Spanish ship that sank in a hurricane

The saga of the Santa Margarita begins in 1622. Namesake of the patron saint of homeless people, midwives and reformed prostitutes, Santa Margarita was a Spanish galleon of 600 tons, armed with twenty-five cannon. One of a fleet of 28 ships, she was voyaging to Spain with an enormous cargo of plundered New World treasures. In registered wealth, the Santa Margarita carried 166,574 silver “pieces of eight” treasure coins, more than 550 ingots of silver weighing some 10,000 pounds, and over 9,000 ounces of gold in the form of bars, discs and bits.
Additionally, there was contraband — a fortune in “unregistered” treasure having been smuggled on board to avoid paying a 20 percent tax to the Spanish king. The Santa Margarita also carried riches in the form of copper, silverware, indigo, and personal possessions of officers, passengers, and crew, including medical tools, navigational instruments, gold coins, and precious jewelry of almost unimaginable opulence.

Spain and her creditors awaited the arrival of the fleet anxiously; as its return would refresh the royal coffers, repay loans, and lessen the financial pressures that plagued the kingdom. But when news of the fleet arrived, it wasn't good. Subsequent to departing the island of Cuba on September 4, the fleet was overtaken by a rapidly developing storm. Within days, the Santa Margarita, along with five other ships in the fleet, were wrecked near the Marqueses Keys in the Florida Straits. Drowned were 550 passengers and crew, 142 from the Santa Margarita. Lost was a king's ransom in treasure, a serious setback for Spain, whose supremacy in the world was upheld by the wealth of the Indies.
Margarita in Greek means pearl, and the first attempt to find and salvage the Santa Margarita and other fleet casualties was undertaken almost immediately by the Spanish mariner Captain Gaspar de Vargas, who, knowing of their skills, sent for pearl divers — from the island of Margarita — to aid in the search.

Then, in 1624, Havana politician Francisco Melian obtained a royal salvage contract for the fleet galleons. This inventive risk-taker manufactured a remarkable piece of equipment that allowed his divers to see and breathe while working underwater. It was a diving bell, and it was this invention that allowed an enslaved diver to locate the first treasure of the Santa Margarita and win his freedom.

Melian continued, with some success, to salvage treasure from the galleon for several years, though his efforts were frequently interrupted by weather and Dutch sea forces. Eventually, however, search and recovery became unfeasible, and ended, and a vast fortune was left buried in the deep shifting sands of the Florida Straits. In time, the Santa Margarita was forgotten, but not forever. Records of Melian's salvage efforts survived; in fragile worm chewed papers in Spain's archives.
Fast forward to the 21st century, and the emergence of search and salvage company Blue Water Ventures, founded by entrepreneur W. Keith Webb.
Largely the result of extensive research conducted for the late treasure hunter Mel Fisher by historian Dr. Eugene Lyon, a portion of the Santa Margarita was discovered in 1980. “The rest — multi-millions in treasures and artifacts — is still out there,” says Webb. “Remote sensing technology has progressed dramatically since the last significant finds occurred, and this advancement prompted me to contact Mel Fishers Treasures, the company that holds the federal permit to search the area. I proposed a joint-venture partnership whereby I would bring my own team, vessels, and technology to work.”

With a partnership agreed upon, Webb began to recruit a world-class lineup of professionals that today includes historian Lyon; archaeologist/conservator James Sinclair; and as Operations Manager, second-generation search and recovery specialist Dan Porter. Captain Porter and Gary Randolph, Blue Water's Chief Technical Advisor and MFT Vice President of Operations, immediately began digitizing old charts and coalescing the past with the present.

This aligning of knowledge, experience and skill, backed by resources, technology, and the requisite touch of luck has resulted in the most successful series of discoveries on the site in more than 20 years.
The value of the treasure recovered from the Santa Margarita by the Blue Water Ventures team has well exceeded $16 million to date. The search and recovery is funded by investors who share in the discoveries, receiving their portions each year following a formal legal adjudication and division procedure.

The Santa Margarita broke apart and was scattered in a series of storms. Over time the wood disintegrated and the ship's remains and cargo became buried in deep sand and mud. By mapping and recording all finds, the team is able to identify scatter patterns, which eventually serve as pointers to substantial deposits. Now, working further north than ever before, the crew of the company's primary search vessel, Blue Water Rose, have made astounding discoveries of elaborate gold artifacts, chains and jewelry, gold bars, rare silver coins, a gold and rock crystal religious reliquary, a captivating solid gold combination toothpick/earwax removal spoon, a magnificent solid gold chalice, and one of Santa Margarita's most serendipitous hidden treasures-a lead box containing 16,184 rare and valuable natural pearls, not listed on the ship's manifest-now believed to have originated from the pearl island of Margarita.
Artifacts from the ship are currently on display at the Mel Fisher Maritime Heritage Museum in Key West.

References

Further reading

Shipwrecks of the Florida Keys
Maritime incidents in 1622